Gino Cudsi credited as "Gino" or "Georgino Cudsi" is a Greek singer who had a string of successful singles in Greece, UK, Italy, Spain, and Germany during the 1960s. Contestant at Sanremo Song Festival 1966 (singing "Dipendesse Da Me")

Discography
Singles
"Proesthanome" 
"Orfanos"
"Et maintenant"
"The Secret / Big Wide World" 1963 
"Il Primo Bacio / Signora Simpatica" 1964 
"Ma cosa sai/Dipendesse da me" 1966
"Missirlù", rebetiko song sung in Italian [as "Gino e Dorine", Ricordi Rec.] 1967 
"Neanderthal Man, [as Gino & Lucille] 1970 
"Χτύπησαν Εννιά (Sono Gia Le Tre) / Σε Φωνάζω Να Γυρίσης (Senza Amore)" 1970  
"Montego Bay / Yellow River" 1970
"Luiza Luiza / Sing My Heart Sing"  1970
"We'll Make It Someday / I'm A Boy In Love" 1971 
"Give A Hand / You Are My Everything" 1972
"Let's Try Once Again (Se Mi Lasci) / Light My Fire (Ma Tu)" 1976 [as Gino and Lucille]

References

Living people
Year of birth missing (living people)
20th-century Greek male singers